Francesco Sannino (born 9 February 1968) is an Italian theoretical physicist and a professor at the University of Southern Denmark. He conducts research in the topics of effective field theories and their applications to strongly coupled theories such as quantum chromodynamics. He also researches in beyond standard model physics and quantum field theory.

After his studies at the University of Naples, Federico II in 1992, he enrolled in PhD programmes at Syracuse University and University of Naples, obtaining the doctoral degree in 1997.

In 1997, he obtained a research fellowship from Yale University and in 2000 he moved to NORDITA.  
In 2004 he became  associate professor at the Niels Bohr Institute in Denmark.
In 2007 he has been a paid associate at CERN
 while becoming full professor at the University of Southern Denmark. 
In 2009 the research centre CP3-Origins at University of Southern Denmark was formed under his leadership by the Danish Research Foundation. 
In 2010 he was awarded the EliteForsk Prize for researchers by the Danish Ministry of Science.

See also
Through_the_Wormhole#Season_4_(2013)

References

External links
Scientific publications of Francesco Sannino on INSPIRE-HEP

21st-century Italian physicists
21st-century Danish physicists
Quantum physicists
Syracuse University alumni
Academic staff of the University of Southern Denmark
Living people
1968 births
Theoretical physicists
People associated with CERN